Kalachinsky District is an administrative and municipal district (raion), one of the thirty-two in Omsk Oblast, Russia. It is located in the southeast of the oblast. Its administrative center is the town of Kalachinsk (which is not administratively a part of the district). Population: 18,197 (2010 Census);

Administrative and municipal status
Within the framework of administrative divisions, Kalachinsky District is one of the thirty-two in the oblast. The town of Kalachinsk serves as its administrative center, despite being incorporated separately as a town of oblast significance—an administrative unit with the status equal to that of the districts.

As a municipal division, the district is incorporated as Kalachinsky Municipal District, with the town of oblast significance of Kalachinsk being incorporated within it as Kalachinsk Urban Settlement.

Notable residents 

Alexander Altunin (1921–1989), Soviet general and politician, born in the village of Steklyanka

References

Notes

Sources

Districts of Omsk Oblast

